Raúl González Blanco (born 27 June 1977), known as Raúl, is a Spanish football manager and former player who played as a forward. He is the current manager of Real Madrid Castilla, the reserve team of La Liga club Real Madrid. Raúl is regarded as one of the greatest players of his era.

Raúl was born in the San Cristóbal de los Ángeles neighborhood of Madrid where he played for the local youth team before moving to the Atlético Madrid youth team. He later moved to Real Madrid's youth academy and played at its various levels. In 1994, he signed his first professional contract with the fourth division team Real Madrid C, and then was swiftly promoted to the first team.

He spent 16 years of his career playing for Real Madrid and is the club's third all-time top goalscorer with 323 goals and has the most appearances in the history of the club, with 741. With Los Blancos, Raúl won six La Liga titles, three UEFA Champions League titles, scoring in two finals, four Supercopa de España titles, one UEFA Super Cup and two Intercontinental Cups. In 2003, he was appointed captain of the team and retained the position until he left the club in 2010. He then signed for Schalke 04, where he won a DFB-Pokal and DFL-Supercup, before signing for Qatari club Al Sadd in 2012, where he won the league and the Emir of Qatar Cup. He ended his career with New York Cosmos in 2015, after winning a domestic treble.

Raúl is the sixth-highest goalscorer in the history of La Liga with 228 goals. He is also the highest Spanish scorer in European leagues, with 256 goals, scoring 228 goals in La Liga and 28 goals in the Bundesliga. He also has the third-most appearances in the history of La Liga, 550 matches. He is the fifth highest goalscorer in Champions League history with 71 goals, and has played the fifth most games. He has also played 1,000 matches in his career, one of only 18 players to have done so.

Although he did not win any major competitions while playing for the Spain national team, he scored a then-record 44 goals in 102 appearances for la Roja, appearing in three FIFA World Cups and two European championships. Raúl took over the captaincy of the side in 2002 and held it until 2006, the year in which he played his last international match.

Raúl was named the top international goalscorer in the world by International Federation of Football History & Statistics in 1999, and ranked second in the 2001 Ballon d'Or and third in the 2001 FIFA World Player of the Year. In 2004, he was named in the FIFA 100 list of the world's greatest living players, and was included in the UEFA list of the 50-best European players of the 1954–2004 period. He was part of the European Team of the Year of European Sports Media in 1997, 1999 and 2000. Raúl won two Pichichi trophies (1999 and 2001), the top goalscorer award of the UEFA Champions League (2000 and 2001), five Don Balón Awards (1997, 1999, 2000, 2001 and 2002) and one Best Player Award at the Intercontinental Cup in 1998.

Club career

Youth clubs
Raúl's career began at his local team CD San Cristóbal de los Ángeles playing for their Alevín team and the Infantil the next season. He signed with Atlético Madrid's Infantil team and won a national title with the Cadete team the following season. Following Atlético's then-president Jesús Gil decision to close their youth academy as a cost-saving measure, Raúl moved on to Real Madrid's Cadete team in La Fábrica. The following season, he was promoted to the Juvenil C team and subsequently went on to play for their Juvenil B and Juvenil A team. While with the Real youth set-up, Raúl won the Dallas Cup in 1993 and 1994.

Real Madrid

He started his professional career in the 1994–95 season with Real Madrid C. He scored 16 goals in just nine games (including five in one match against CD Corralejo) and was swiftly promoted to the first team by coach Jorge Valdano, replacing Emilio Butragueño in a symbolic "passing of the crown." He became the youngest player – 17 years and 124 days – ever to play for the senior side, though the record was broken by Alberto Rivera later that same season. On 29 October 1994, in an away game against Real Zaragoza at La Romareda, he created a goal for strike partner Iván Zamorano, heralding the demise of Butragueño in the process. The next week, Raúl scored his first goal in his second senior game on a home debut against Madrid rivals and former youth club Atlético Madrid in a bitter derby match. Fully establishing himself as a fixture in the first team, Raúl registered a total of nine goals in 28 appearances to help Real Madrid win the 1994–95 league championship in his first season.

With Real Madrid, he won several honours, including further La Liga titles in 1996–97 (scoring 21 La Liga goals), 2000–01 (scoring 24 La Liga goals), and 2002–03 (scoring 16 La Liga goals in a campaign truncated by a bout of appendicitis for which Raúl was hospitalised). During the period from 1998 to 2002, Raúl and Real Madrid also won three UEFA Champions League trophies in 1998, 2000, and 2002. For most of this time, Raúl struck up a prolific scoring partnership with Fernando Morientes and later Ronaldo. During a La Liga game against fierce rivals Barcelona at the Nou Camp in October 1999, Raúl silenced the hostile home crowd of almost 100,000 fans when he scored and then memorably celebrated his goal by putting a finger to his lips as though to tell them to be quiet. Raúl took over the captaincy of Real Madrid when Fernando Hierro was transferred in 2003, a responsibility he held until leaving the club in 2010. Despite appearing in two finals, in 2002 (in which he scored) and 2004, Raúl never lifted the Copa del Rey.

He became the first player to score 50 Champions League goals when he scored in a 2–1 group stage win over Olympiacos on 28 September 2005, and was also the first to make 100 appearances in the competition. He was also the first player to score in two Champions League finals, since the competition was renamed, scoring in the finals of both 2000 against Valencia in the Stade de France, Saint-Denis, and 2002 against Bayer Leverkusen at Hampden Park, Glasgow.

Raúl holds the distinction of having never been sent off in his 17 years at the professional level. On 11 November 2008, Raúl scored his 300th goal for Real Madrid with a hat-trick against Real Unión, with Real winning the match 4–3 but being eliminated on away goals after drawing 6–6 on aggregate. In total, Raúl scored 323 goals for Real Madrid, breaking the long-standing club record of Alfredo Di Stéfano (307) with a volleyed goal against Sporting de Gijón on 15 February 2009. He is presently fifth on the all-time list of La Liga goalscorers, behind Argentine Lionel Messi, Portuguese Cristiano Ronaldo, Spaniard Telmo Zarra and Mexican Hugo Sánchez.

Raúl and fellow long-serving teammate Iker Casillas were both awarded "contracts for life" in 2008, the terms of which stipulated that the contracts would be renewed annually for as long as they played 30 matches each season. On 23 September 2009, Raúl equalled Manolo Sanchís' league appearance record for Real Madrid, and is second in La Liga behind Andoni Zubizarreta, who played in 622 matches.

Along with years of captaincy for both Real Madrid and Spain, Raúl was known as "El Capitan" ("The Captain").

Raúl's last touch with the ball as a Real Madrid player before an injury ruled him out of action for the rest of that season was to score his last goal, the opening goal scored on 24 April 2010 in a 2–1 away victory against Real Zaragoza in La Romareda, coincidentally the stadium where he made his debut in 1994. It was scored in the 50th minute after Raúl (himself only on the pitch as a substitute for Rafael van der Vaart after 15 minutes) had signalled he could not physically continue and was prepared to be substituted off for Karim Benzema one minute after the goal. Before the substitution could be made, Real Madrid launched a counter-attack to create a goal. Though Raúl ran to a slow hobble, he shuffled into the box and was able to poke the ball from Cristiano Ronaldo's pass.

Having spent the rest of the season recovering from that injury, the club confirmed on 25 July 2010 that Raúl would be leaving the club, a day after his teammate Guti confirmed he was also leaving after a 15-year spell.

Schalke 04

Raúl signed a two-year contract with Schalke 04 on 28 July 2010. Schalke head coach Felix Magath hailed the signing and told the club website, "It's great news for FC Schalke 04, I am pleased that we have succeeded in signing such an exceptional footballer and world-class striker switching to the Bundesliga for Schalke 04." Raúl chose Schalke because they qualified for the 2010–11 UEFA Champions League.

Raúl scored his first goal for the club during his first match on 1 August 2010 with a brace in a 3–1 victory over Bayern Munich in the final match of the pre-season competition LIGA total! Cup 2010. One week later, he made his competitive debut in the 2010 DFL-Supercup on 7 August 2010 again against Bayern, but this time he failed to score in the 2–0 defeat. Raúl made his Bundesliga debut on 21 August 2010 in a 2–1 defeat against Hamburger SV. and scored his first goal for Schalke in the Bundesliga against Borussia Mönchengladbach on 25 September 2010 in a 2–2 draw. After a quiet start, he rediscovered his goalscoring form in the Bundesliga with a brace against FC St. Pauli on 5 November in a 3–0 win, and on 20 November, he scored his first hat-trick for the club in a 4–0 win over Werder Bremen. On 18 December, he scored his second hat-trick for Schalke in a 3–0 win against 1. FC Köln.

Raúl scored another crucial goal on 2 March 2011 in a 1–0 victory over Bayern Munich in the semi-final of 2010–11 DFB-Pokal. After being absent for six years, Schalke ultimately reached the finals since 2005. In the final match, they played against MSV Duisburg, the first 2. Bundesliga team which reached the final since 2004. Raúl never won a domestic cup with Real Madrid (the Copa del Rey), but on 21 May 2011, in his first season, he finally won a domestic cup and got his maiden trophy with his new club. They won the tournament with a 5–0 win at the Olympiastadion in Berlin. This success was followed with victory two months later on 23 July 2011 in the 2011 DFL-Supercup against the league champions and rivals Borussia Dortmund.

In European play, Raúl has since become the highest goal scorer in all UEFA competitions with 73 goals, ahead of Milan veteran Filippo Inzaghi with 70 goals. He scored 71 goals in the Champions League (66 goals with Real Madrid and five with Schalke 04) and in addition his two goals with Los Blancos, one goal in the 2000 UEFA Super Cup and the other one in the 1998 Intercontinental Cup. On 22 October 2010, Raúl scored twice against Hapoel Tel Aviv in a 3–1 win, which tied him with German legend Gerd Müller for the most European goals. Raúl fully broke this record on 15 February 2011 on his return to Spain with a crucial away goal in the round of 16 tie against Valencia at the Mestalla Stadium in a 1–1 draw.

In the quarter-finals, Raúl scored two goals against Internazionale: one goal in the first leg, a 5–2 away win at the San Siro, and one in the second leg, a 2–1 home win at the Veltins-Arena. Schalke progressed to the semi-finals of the UEFA Champions League for the first time in their history, where they played against Manchester United. Schalke lost the first match 2–0, which was their first home defeat this season in the tournament, and lost again 4–1 in Old Trafford. Despite the defeat, Raúl considered it an honour that he had swapped shirts with Ryan Giggs. On 19 November 2011, he captained Schalke for the first time due to an injury to Benedikt Höwedes in a 4–0 home win against 1. FC Nürnberg. He also scored the second goal and assisted the fourth in that match.

Raúl scored another hat-trick against Werder Bremen on 17 December 2011. The goals came in a 5–0 win that cemented Schalke's position in third place going into the winter break. On 19 February 2012, he scored the 400th goal of his career; at that time he had scored 323 with Real Madrid, 44 with Spain and 33 with Schalke. On 5 April 2012, in the second leg of the UEFA Europa League match against Athletic Bilbao, he scored his 77th goal in a European competition.

With his goal in the semifinals of the German Cup against Bayern Munich at the Allianz Arena, together with his team, he qualified for the final of said competition. His great performances in the European Cup this season earned him to be included in the best eleven of the competition awarded by UEFA.

At a press conference on 19 April 2012, Raúl announced he would leave Schalke after his contract expired in June, and that "[his] future is not in Europe". Raúl had such an impact at Schalke that, on his departure, the club opted to retire the number 7 shirt for an indefinite period. However, in 2013, the number 7 shirt was given to Max Meyer, Schalke's new prodigy.

Al Sadd

On 12 May 2012, it was announced Raúl had signed a deal with Qatari side Al Sadd for the 2012–13 Qatar Stars League season. He played his first competitive match for the club on 5 August in the 2012 Sheikh Jassem Cup, scoring a penalty in extra time in order to secure a 2–0 win against Mesaimeer. The veteran also took on the role of captain after Abdulla Koni was substituted. On 13 April 2013, Raúl captained Al Sadd to the 2012–13 Qatar Stars League title. Raúl scored 9 goals in 22 appearances to help Al Sadd win their first title in five years. He was also presented with the post-season QFA-sanctioned Fair Play Award in May 2013.

On 22 August 2013, Raúl played for Real Madrid in the first half of the Trofeo Santiago Bernabéu and scored the first goal. He then played the second half for Al Sadd as Real Madrid won 5–0. On 5 March 2014, Raúl announced he would retire from professional football at the end of the Qatari football season.

New York Cosmos

On 30 October 2014, Raúl returned to professional football and signed with the New York Cosmos in the United States. He made his North American Soccer League (NASL) debut on 4 April 2015 in a 1–0 win against the Fort Lauderdale Strikers, partially owned by his former Real Madrid strike partner Ronaldo, leaving with a hamstring injury in the second half. The following week, at the Indy Eleven, he scored his first goal to equalise in a 1–1 draw. Raúl scored four times as the undefeated Cosmos won the spring season with five wins and five draws.

On 16 October 2015, it was again announced Raúl would retire at the end of the season. The Cosmos finished with the best regular season record, winning the North American Supporters' Trophy. On 7 November, he scored the winning goal as his team came from behind to win 2–1 against the Strikers in the semi-finals, earning a place at Soccer Bowl 2015, which they won 3–2 against the Ottawa Fury eight days later. He reiterated his decision to retire after the Soccer Bowl.

International career
Raúl began his Spain career at the youth level and represented the nation at the 1995 FIFA U-20 World Cup, scoring three goals from five matches. He was also part of the under-21 side that reached the final of the 1996 UEFA European Under-21 Championship, and even scored his side's temporary equaliser in the final, although he later missed his penalty in the resulting shoot-out, which was won by Italy. In total, he scored 17 goals at the various youth levels for Spain. With the senior team, Raúl went on for many years to score a national record 44 goals in 102 caps for Spain. However, David Villa later equaled Raúl's record in 2010 and surpassed it on 25 March 2011 in a UEFA Euro 2012 qualifier. Of his 44 international goals, Raúl scored 32 goals in competitive matches, six of which were in the finals of major tournaments and 12 from friendly matches.

1998 FIFA World Cup
Raúl earned his first senior cap against the Czech Republic on 9 October 1996, playing the full 90 minutes of a goalless draw in 1998 FIFA World Cup qualification at the Letná Stadion in Prague. In his third match, on 14 December against Yugoslavia at the Mestalla Stadium, he recorded his first international goal in a 2–0 qualifying win. At the final tournament in France, Raúl featured in every match as Spain were eliminated from Group D. He scored in their opening match to put them 2–1 up in an eventual 2–3 loss to Nigeria in Nantes.

UEFA Euro 2000
On 27 March 1999, in a UEFA Euro 2000 qualifier, Raúl scored four goals in Spain's 9–0 rout of Austria. Four days later, he scored three goals in a 6–0 away win against San Marino during the same qualifying tournament. On 5 June, against the same opponents in Villarreal, he was again on target in a 9–0 rout. Raúl played every minute of Spain's Euro 2000 finals campaign in Belgium and the Netherlands. He scored the first goal in their 2–1 win over Slovenia at the Amsterdam Arena. Spain were knocked out in the quarter-finals by eventual champions France; Raúl missed a last minute penalty which would have taken the tie to extra-time.

2002 FIFA World Cup
At the 2002 FIFA World Cup in South Korea and Japan, Raúl opened a 3–1 win over the Slovenes in Spain's first Group B match, and added two more in a 3–2 win over South Africa in Daejeon to advance as group winners. He suffered a groin injury in the round of 16 win over the Republic of Ireland, and missed the remainder of the tournament, in which Spain went out to South Korea in the quarter-finals.

UEFA Euro 2004
On 7 September 2002, Raúl scored in a 2–0 away win over Greece in Euro 2004 qualifying, putting him on 29 goals in 56 international games, equalling the national goalscoring record set by the recently retired Fernando Hierro. He broke the record on 12 February 2003 when he scored twice in a 3–1 friendly win over Germany at Son Moix in Palma, Mallorca. He started every match at the Euro 2004 finals in Portugal, in which Spain crashed out at the group stage.

2006 FIFA World Cup
Raúl earned his 89th cap on 8 October 2005 in a 2–0 away win over Belgium in 2006 World Cup qualifying, levelling with Hierro as Spain's most-capped outfield player. However, he played less frequently across the campaign as new manager Luis Aragonés preferred to partner David Villa and Fernando Torres.

At the final tournament in Germany, he came on at half-time for Luis García in the second group match in Stuttgart, with Spain trailing Tunisia 0–1. When goalkeeper Ali Boumnijel could not retain Cesc Fàbregas' shot in the 72nd minute, Raúl equalised from close range as Spain eventually won 3–1.

On 15 August 2006, Raúl won his 100th cap for Spain, in a goalless friendly draw with Iceland in Reykjavík. He was last chosen for the national team on 6 September, in a 3–2 defeat against Northern Ireland in Belfast, a match in which he hit the post late on.

Managerial career

Real Madrid U15s
On 17 August 2018, Raúl was appointed youth coach at Real Madrid, taking charge of the Cadete B (under-15) squad.

Real Madrid Castilla
On 20 June 2019, he was appointed manager of Real Madrid Castilla. He began the season with three wins, five draws, and five losses.

Style of play

A prolific goalscorer and a highly creative forward, Raúl is regarded as one of the greatest and most consistent forwards of his generation. Wearing the number 7 jersey for most of his club and international career, he was capable of playing anywhere along the front line, although he was primarily deployed as a centre-forward, or as a supporting striker. He was also capable of playing as a number 10 behind the forwards, and was even used out of position as a left winger by manager Fabio Capello during the 1996–97 season. Raúl was a quick, left-footed player, who was capable of scoring both in and outside the penalty area with his accurate and powerful shot, and had a penchant for scoring goals from chips. He possessed excellent ball control, first touch, balance, vision and technical ability, and was effective in the air as well.

Although primarily renowned for prolific goalscoring, Raúl was also a highly creative and hardworking player, capable of playing off of his teammates, creating chances and assisting goals, and was occasionally deployed as an attacking midfielder in his later career. In addition to these characteristics, Raúl is remembered for his leadership and discipline – throughout his extensive career, he never received a red card, and he was rarely booked. For his technical skills, elegance, flair,  goalscoring and performances, he was nicknamed "El Ferrari", or "The Ferrari," by compatriot Fernando Hierro, another emblematic Real Madrid player. He was also an accurate penalty taker and free kick taker . In 2013, former England centre-back Rio Ferdinand praised Raúl for his clever movement off the ball, and his ability to exploit gaps or draw out defenders in order to create space for his teammates' runs, describing him as: "the most intelligent player [he'd] played against."

Media
Raúl has been sponsored by German sportswear company Adidas during his career and has appeared in Adidas commercials. He has advertised Adidas Predator football boots, and in 2004 he starred in an Adidas commercial featuring a number of other stars on mopeds, including Zinedine Zidane, Michael Ballack, Alessandro Del Piero and David Trezeguet.

Raúl has featured in Pepsi commercials, including an advertisement for the 2002 World Cup in Korea and Japan where he lined up alongside players including David Beckham, Roberto Carlos and Gianluigi Buffon in taking on a team of Sumo players.

Raúl features in EA Sports' FIFA video game series. His regular goal celebration of kissing the ring finger – a show of affection to his wife – appears in FIFA 18.

Personal life

Throughout his career, Raúl's goal celebration consisted of kissing his wedding ring as an acknowledgment to his wife Mamen Sanz, whom he married in 1999 and with whom he has four sons and a daughter: Jorge, Hugo, twins Héctor and Mateo, and María. Jorge and Hugo are both footballers; Jorge at Fordham Preparatory School in New York City, and Hugo in New York City FC's academy. In 2022 his daughter Maria has been signed by Real Madrid's U15 football team.

Career statistics

Club

1 Played in Copa del Rey with Real Madrid,  DFB-Pokal with Schalke 04, Qatari Stars Cup, Emir of Qatar Cup, Qatar Cup and Sheikh Jassem Cup with Al Sadd and in Lamar Hunt U.S. Open Cup with New York Cosmos.
2 Played in UEFA Champions League and UEFA Cup/UEFA Europa League with Real Madrid and Schalke 04, and in AFC Champions League with Al Sadd.
3 Includes other competitive competitions, including the Supercopa de España, UEFA Super Cup, Intercontinental Cup, FIFA Club World Cup with Real Madrid, DFL-Supercup with Schalke 04 and NASL Championship with New York Cosmos.

International

Managerial statistics

Honours

Player
Real Madrid Youth
Dallas Cup: 1993, 1994

Real Madrid
La Liga: 1994–95, 1996–97, 2000–01, 2002–03, 2006–07, 2007–08
Supercopa de España: 1997, 2001, 2003, 2008
UEFA Champions League: 1997–98, 1999–2000, 2001–02 
UEFA Super Cup: 2002
Intercontinental Cup: 1998, 2002

Schalke 04
DFB-Pokal: 2010–11
DFL-Supercup: 2011

Al Sadd
Qatar Stars League: 2012–13
Emir of Qatar Cup: 2014

New York Cosmos
North American Soccer League: Spring Season 2015
North American Supporters' Trophy: 2015
Soccer Bowl: 2015

Spain U21
UEFA European Under-21 Championship runner-up:1996

Individual

 La Liga's Breakthrough Player: 1994–95
 Zarra Trophy: 1995–96, 1998–99, 2000–01, 2002–03
 La Liga's Best Spanish Player: 1996–97, 1998–99, 1999–2000, 2000–01, 2001–02 (record)
 European Sports Magazines Team of the Year: 1996–97, 1998–99, 1999–2000
 Pichichi Trophy: 1998–99, 2000–01
 IFFHS World's Top Goal Scorer: 1999
 UEFA Euro 2000 qualifying top goalscorer
 UEFA Champions League top goalscorer: 1999–2000, 2000–01
 UEFA Club Forward of the Year: 1999–2000, 2000–01, 2001–02
 UEFA Euro Team of the Tournament: 2000
 Ballon d'Or runner-up: 2001
 FIFA World Player of the Year Bronze award: 2001
 UEFA Champions League top assist provider: 2002–03
 FIFA 100
 Trofeo Alfredo Di Stéfano: 2007–08
 Marca Leyenda: 2009
 Golden Foot Award Runner-up: 2009, 2010, 2011
 Goal of the Month in Germany: August 2011, March 2012, April 2012, July 2013
 Goal of the Year in Germany: 2011, 2013 (shared with Julian Draxler)
 Qatar Stars League Fair Play Award: 2013
 NASL Player of the Month: May 2015

Records
Real Madrid Record Appearance Maker: 741 games
Real Madrid Record Appearance Maker in La Liga: 550 games
European Competitions Record Appearance Maker: 150*
Third leading scorer in the world (throughout history), according to IFFHS Statistics: 125 goals^^

*Includes other European competitive competitions, including the UEFA Cup Winners' Cup, UEFA Intertoto Cup, UEFA Europa League, UEFA Super Cup.
^^Includes other European competitive competitions and Intercontinental Cup.
Has not received a red card in entire career.

Manager
Real Madrid U19
UEFA Youth League: 2019–20

Decorations
 Government of Spain: Gold Medal of the Royal Order of Sporting Merit 2006
 City of Madrid: Gold Medal 2009

See also 
 List of footballers with 100 or more UEFA Champions League appearances
 List of men's footballers with 100 or more international caps
 List of men's footballers with the most official appearances
 List of Real Madrid CF records and statistics
 List of La Liga players (400+ appearances)

References

Bibliography

External links

 Raúl González Blanco at Real Madrid 
 
 
 
 Raúl González National team data at BDFutbol
 
 
 
 Raúl González Blanco – Goals in International Matches at Rec.Sport.Soccer Statistics Foundation
 Raúl González Blanco – Goals in European Cups at Rec.Sport.Soccer Statistics Foundation
 New York Cosmos Profile

1977 births
Living people
Footballers from Madrid
Spanish footballers
Association football forwards
Real Madrid C footballers
Real Madrid Castilla footballers
Real Madrid CF players
FC Schalke 04 players
Al Sadd SC players
New York Cosmos (2010) players
Segunda División B players
Segunda División players
La Liga players
Bundesliga players
Qatar Stars League players
North American Soccer League players
Pichichi Trophy winners
UEFA Champions League winning players
UEFA Champions League top scorers
Spain youth international footballers
Spain under-21 international footballers
Spain under-23 international footballers
Olympic footballers of Spain
Spain international footballers
Footballers at the 1996 Summer Olympics
1998 FIFA World Cup players
UEFA Euro 2000 players
2002 FIFA World Cup players
UEFA Euro 2004 players
2006 FIFA World Cup players
FIFA Century Club
FIFA 100
Spanish expatriate footballers
Spanish expatriate sportspeople in Germany
Spanish expatriate sportspeople in Qatar
Spanish expatriate sportspeople in the United States
Expatriate footballers in Germany
Expatriate footballers in Qatar
Expatriate soccer players in the United States
Spanish football managers
Real Madrid Castilla managers
Primera Federación managers
Segunda División B managers
FAO Goodwill ambassadors
Real Madrid CF non-playing staff